Emmanuel Episcopal Church may refer to:

 Emmanuel Church (Killingworth, Connecticut)
 Emmanuel Episcopal Church (Hailey, Idaho)
 Emmanuel Episcopal Church (La Grange, Illinois)
 Emmanuel Episcopal Church (Cumberland, Maryland)
 Emmanuel Episcopal Church, Boston, Massachusetts
 Emmanuel Episcopal Church (Miles City, Montana)
 Emmanuel Episcopal Church (Elmira, New York)
 Emmanuel Episcopal Church (Little Falls, New York)
 Emmanuel Episcopal Church (Pittsburgh, Pennsylvania)
 Emmanuel Episcopal Church (Cumberland, Rhode Island)
 Emmanuel Church (Newport, Rhode Island)
 Emmanuel Episcopal Church (Rapid City, South Dakota), listed on the NRHP in South Dakota
 Emmanuel Episcopal Church (Lockhart, Texas), a National Register of Historic Places listing in Caldwell County, Texas
 Emmanuel Episcopal Church (San Angelo, Texas)
 Emmanuel Episcopal Church (Alexandria, Virginia)
 Emmanuel Episcopal Church (Port Conway, Virginia)
 Emmanuel Episcopal Church (Powhatan, Virginia)
 Emmanuel Church at Brook Hill, Richmond, Virginia
 Emmanuel Episcopal Church (Eastsound, Washington)

 Emmanuel Episcopal Church (Geneva), Switzerland

See also
Emmanuel Church (disambiguation)